Smokin' may refer to:

Albums
 [[Smokin' (Bobby Miller album)|Smokin (Bobby Miller album)]]
 [[Smokin' (Charles Earland album)|Smokin (Charles Earland album)]]
 [[Smokin' (Curtis Fuller album)|Smokin (Curtis Fuller album)]]
 [[Smokin' (Eddie "Lockjaw" Davis album)|Smokin''' (Eddie "Lockjaw" Davis album)]]
 [[Smokin' (Humble Pie album)|Smokin (Humble Pie album)]]
 Smokin (Jonny Lang album)
 [[Smokin' (Smokey Robinson album)|Smokin (Smokey Robinson album)]]
 Smokin, a 1982 album by Billy Cobham's Glass Menagerie

Songs
 "Smokin'" (song), B-side 1976
 "Smokin'", the lead track from Welsh band Super Furry Animals' 1998 Ice Hockey Hair EP
 "Smokin'", a song by Nas from Stillmatic "Smokin' (Empty, Try Another)", a song by Joni Mitchell from Dog Eat Dog "Smokin'", a song by Teddy Edwards from Heart & Soul "Smokin'", a song by MC Breed from Funkafied''
 "Smokin'", a song by Mal Waldron from Sweet Love, Bitter (album)

See also
 Smokin' in the Boys Room
 Smoking (disambiguation)
 Smoking Joe (disambiguation)